Sahoro Dam  is a gravity dam located in Hokkaido Prefecture in Japan. The dam is used for flood control. The catchment area of the dam is 78 km2. The dam impounds about 64  ha of land when full and can store 10400 thousand cubic meters of water. The construction of the dam was started on 1970 and completed in 1984.

References

Dams in Hokkaido